The Mile Championship is an International Grade I flat horse race in Japan for three-year-old and above thoroughbreds run over a distance of 1,600 metres (approximately 1 mile) on the turf at Kyoto Racecourse in November. It was first run in 1984.

It is traditionally considered as a step race of Hong Kong Mile in Japan Racing. Particularly before the introduction of Hanshin Cup (Grade 2, 1400m) in 2006, as being the last graded event in mile distance in the Japan racing season and most of the winners or runners-up will travel to Hong Kong pursuing extra prize money. Including the only Japanese winner by then Hat Trick.

Winners

 The 2020, 2021 and 2022 runnings took place at Hanshin while Kyoto was closed for redevelopment.

See also
 Horse racing in Japan
 List of Japanese flat horse races

References
Racing Post: 

External links 
 Horse Racing in Japan

Horse races in Japan
Open mile category horse races
Turf races in Japan